Tognetti is a surname. Notable people with this surname include:

 Ernst Tognetti, Swiss wrestler
 Marina Tognetti, founder and CEO of Myngle, a pioneer in the live online language education 
 Richard Leo Tognetti (born 1965), Australian violinist, composer and conductor

See also 
 Togni